J. Patrick Gray is a professor of anthropology at University of Wisconsin–Milwaukee.

His research fields are holocultural research, sociobiology, methodology, and religion. He received his PhD degree from the University of Colorado at Boulder in 1974. He has authored sixteen articles, one book, co-edited another book with James Silverberg, and was Editor of the World Cultures eJournal from 1992 to 2013 superseded by Gregory Truex.

Book publication 
 Silverberg, J., and J. Patrick Gray (eds.) Aggression and Peacefulness in Humans and Other Primates. Oxford: Oxford University Press. {1992} 
 Patrick Gray Primate Sociobiology (Paperback) New Haven: HRAF Press. {1985}

American anthropologists
Anthropology educators
Cross-cultural studies
University of Colorado alumni
University of Wisconsin–Madison faculty
Living people
Year of birth missing (living people)
Academic journal editors